Christophe Charles Steven René Psyché (born 28 July 1988) is a French footballer who plays as a defender for Tromsø. He has previously played for Baník Ostrava, Sogndal, HamKam, Løv-Ham and Oslo City.

Career
Psyché was born in Cannes and he started his career with Oslo City.

After short spells with Løv-Ham, Kristiansund and HamKam, Psyché joined Sogndal in 2014. He made his debut for Sogndal in a 1-3 defeat against Odd.

On 18 January 2018, Psyché signed a two-year deal with Czech team FC Baník Ostrava, before going back to former club Kristiansund.

Career statistics

References

1988 births
Living people
Association football defenders
French footballers
French expatriate footballers
Expatriate footballers in Norway
French expatriate sportspeople in Norway
Løv-Ham Fotball players
Kristiansund BK players
Hamarkameratene players
Sogndal Fotball players
Eliteserien players
Norwegian First Division players
Norwegian Second Division players
Czech First League players
FC Baník Ostrava players
Expatriate footballers in the Czech Republic
Cypriot First Division players
AEL Limassol players
French expatriate sportspeople in the Czech Republic
Expatriate footballers in Cyprus
French expatriate sportspeople in Cyprus
Sportspeople from Cannes
Tromsø IL players
Footballers from Provence-Alpes-Côte d'Azur